The 2014–15 season are the Esteghlal Khuzestan Football Club's second season in the Iran Pro League and the top division of Iranian football. They are also competing in the Hazfi Cup.

Squad

Out on loan

Transfers

Summer 

In:

Out:

Winter

In:

Out:

Competitions

Iran Pro League

Standings

Results summary

Results by round

Matches

Relegation play-off

Hazfi Cup

Squad statistics

Appearances and goals

|-
|colspan="14"|Players who left Esteghlal Khuzestan during the season:
|}

Goal scorers

Disciplinary record

References

External links
Iran Premier League Statistics
Persian League

2014-15
Iranian football clubs 2014–15 season